Nguyen Thanh Liem is a Vietnamese surgeon. He was the recipient of the 2018 Nikkei Asia Prize in Science, Technology and Environment. He is the director of the Vinmec Research Institute of Stem Cell and Gene Technology.

Career
Liem performed the first laparoscopic surgery on a child in Asia. He served as the director of the Vietnam National Children’s Hospital.

In 2018 he received the Nikkei Asia Prize in Science, Technology and Environment for his work in reducing Vietnam’s child mortality rate. As of 2018 he was the director of the Vinmec Research Institute of Stem Cell and Gene Technology.

References

Living people
Year of birth missing (living people)

Vietnamese surgeons
Pediatricians
Winners of the Nikkei Asia Prize